The Strange Boarder is a 1920 American silent drama film directed by Clarence G. Badger and written by Edfrid A. Bingham. The film stars Will Rogers, Irene Rich, Jimmy Rogers, James Mason, Doris Pawn, and Lionel Belmore. The film was released in April 1920, by Goldwyn Pictures.

Cast       
Will Rogers as Sam Gardner
Irene Rich as Jane Ingraham
Jimmy Rogers as Billy Gardner
James Mason as Kittie Hinch 
Doris Pawn as Florry Hinch
Lionel Belmore as Jake Bloom
Jack Richardson as Westmark
Sydney Deane as Dawson
Louis Durham as Sergeant Worrill

References

External links

1920s English-language films
Silent American drama films
1920 drama films
Goldwyn Pictures films
Films directed by Clarence G. Badger
American silent feature films
American black-and-white films
1920s American films